Herman Wright was a jazz bassist. He was born in Detroit, Michigan in 1932, and, in 1960, moved to New York City, where he resided until his death in 1997.

He began on drums as a teen before ultimately settling on upright bass. He worked with Dorothy Ashby, Terry Gibbs, beat poet Allen Ginsberg, Yusef Lateef, George Shearing, Doug Watkins and on one occasion substituted Charles Mingus when the latter wanted to play piano. He can also be heard on Allen Ginsberg's Ginsberg Sings Blake.

He had three sons, Herman Wright Jr. (brass and woodwinds), Paris Wright (drums), and Dewayne Wright (piano).

Discography

As sideman
With Dorothy Ashby
Hip Harp (Prestige, 1958)
In a Minor Groove (New Jazz, 1958)
Dorothy Ashby (Argo, 1961)
Soft Winds (Jazzland, 1961)
With Chet Baker
Smokin' with the Chet Baker Quintet (Prestige, 1965)
Groovin' with the Chet Baker Quintet (Prestige, 1965)
Comin' On with the Chet Baker Quintet (Prestige, 1965)
Cool Burnin' with the Chet Baker Quintet (Prestige, 1965)
Boppin' with the Chet Baker Quintet (Prestige, 1965)
With Allen Ginsberg
Songs of Innocence and Experience (MGM, 1970)
With Al Grey
Snap Your Fingers (Argo, 1962)
Having a Ball (Argo, 1963)
With Yusef Lateef
Cry! - Tender (New Jazz, 1959)
The Three Faces of Yusef Lateef (Riverside, 1960)
Into Something (New Jazz, 1961)
The Golden Flute (Impulse!, 1966)
With Billy Mitchell
This Is Billy Mitchell (Smash, 1962)
A Little Juicy (Smash, 1963)
With Archie Shepp
 Lover Man (Timeless, 1989)
With Sonny Stitt
Pow! (Prestige, 1965 [1967])
With Doug Watkins
Soulnik (New Jazz, 1960)

References

American jazz musicians
Musicians from Detroit
Year of birth missing
American double-bassists
Male double-bassists
Year of death missing
Jazz musicians from Michigan
American male jazz musicians